The Vikinghøgda Formation is a geologic formation in Svalbard, Norway. It preserves fossils dating back to the Early Triassic (Griesbachian-Spathian) period. It is split into three members, from oldest to youngest: the Deltadalen Member (Induan), Lusitaniadalen Member (Smithian), and Vendomdalen Member (Spathian). The formation can be found in central and southern Spitsbergen, as well as the smaller islands of Barentsøya and Edgeøya. The type locality is positioned in the vicinity of Vikinghøgda and Sticky Keep, two low peaks along the southeast edge of the Sassendalen valley in Spitsbergen. The two upper members of the Vikinghøgda Formation were previously grouped together as the Sticky Keep Formation.

Subunits 
The Vikinghøgda Formation is formed by fine-grained marine sediments, such as mudstones, shales, siltstones, and fine sandstones. There is a trend of finer sediments, deeper waters, and higher organic content through the formation. Though fossils are only abundant in the middle part (Lusitaniadalen Member) of the formation, index fossils can be found throughout the whole formation. The Vikinghøgda Formation is one of the better records of Early Triassic chronostratigraphy in the Boreal realm, owing to a combination of continuous sedimentation, distinctive index fossils, palynomorph stratigraphy, magnetostratigraphy, and trace metal cyclostratigraphy.

Deltadalen Member 
The Deltadalen Member is named after the small stream valley which runs between Vikinghøgda and Sticky Keep. The member consists of about 70 meters of silty shales and fine sandstones, lying above the eroded surface of the Permian-age Kapp Starostin Formation. Some of the sandstone beds may be glauconitic or hummocky, and calcareous nodules may be present. Fossils are rare and restricted to these nodules, though they include a variety of silicified ammonoids, conodonts, bivalves, and gastropods. Some index fossils have biostratigraphic significance, such as the ammonoid Otoceras boreale and the conodonts Neogondolella carinata and Neospathodus svalbardensis. These species constrain the member to the Induan stage, between the early Griesbachian and early Dienerian substages. The sandiest intervals can be found at the base and the top of the member. The depositional environment is reconstructed as a shallow marine setting influenced by storms and nearby deltaic sediments.

The Deltadalen Member has been equated with two other Induan-age formations in its vicinity: the Vardebukta Formation (exposed in western Spitsbergen) and the Havert Formation (under the Barents Sea).

A 2020 study reported that the Permian-Triassic boundary occurs near the start of the Deltadalen Member. This was supported by several lines of evidence. The conodont Hindeodus parvus, which defines the base of the Triassic, was reported from a sediment layer 4.1 meters above the base of the member. An overlying tephra bed was dated to 252.13 ± 0.62 Ma via U-Pb radiometric dating, an age which is congruent with other reported estimates for the boundary.

Lusitaniadalen Member 
The Lusitaniadalen Member is named after a glacier on the western flank of Vikinghøgda. The member is about 90 meters thick, mostly composed of laminated silty mudstones. Sandstone beds are less common, though when they occur, they are hummocky. Fossiliferous calcareous nodules are abundant in the sandstone-bearing layers, encasing well-preserved fossils of both invertebrates and vertebrates. The ammonoid index fossils Euflemingites romunderi and Wasatchites tardus indicate that the Lusitaniadalen Member was deposited during the Smithian substage of the Olenekian stage. Fish and amphibians fossils have also been found in this member. The depositional environment corresponds to a deeper and calmer conditions, indicative of a major transgression (sea level rise) affecting the continental shelf.

The Lusitaniadalen Member has been equated with the Iskletten Member of the Tvillingodden Formation (in western Spitsbergen) and the lower part of the Klappmyss Formation (under the Barents Sea). It has also been previously described as the Iskletten Member of the Sticky Keep Formation.

Vendomdalen Member 
Dark shale (laminated mudstone) dominates the 90-meter-thick Vendomdalen Member, though silty yellowish dolomitic beds also occur. Very large dolomite nodules or lenses, some over a meter in width, can also be found in this member. However, fossil-bearing concretions are rarer and more deformed than in the Lusitaniadalen Member. Fossils include abundant bivalves and Spathian ammonoid index fossils, such as Bajarunia euomphala, Keyserlingites subrobustus, and Parasibirites elegans. Marine reptile and fish bonebeds also occur in the Vendomdalen Member. The Vendomdalen Member corresponds to the deepest part of the continental shelf, with high organic matter deposition and no influence from storm events.

The Vendomdalen Member has been equated with the Kaosfjellet Member of the Tvillingodden Formation (in western Spitsbergen) and the upper part of the Klappmyss Formation (under the Barents Sea). It has also been previously described as the Kaosfjellet Member of the Sticky Keep Formation.

See also 
 List of fossiliferous stratigraphic units in Norway

References 

Geologic formations of Norway
Triassic System of Europe
Triassic Norway
Induan Stage
Olenekian Stage
Mudstone formations
Siltstone formations
Shale formations
Sandstone formations
Geology of Svalbard